The 2019 Ekiti State House of Assembly election was held on March 9, 2019, to elect members of the Ekiti State House of Assembly in Nigeria. All the 26 seats were up for election in the Ekiti State House of Assembly.

Funminiyi Afuye from APC representing Ikere I constituency was elected Speaker, while Hakeem Jamiu from APC representing Irepodun/Ifelodun II constituency was elected Deputy Speaker.

Results 
The result of the election is listed below.

 Lucas Oluwatoyin Felix from APC won Ado I constituency
 Balogun Adekemi Adebambi from APC won Ado II constituency
 Olajide Adegoke Ayobami from APC won Efon constituency
 Ayokunle Yemisi from APC won Ekiti South West I constituency
 Olatunji Joseph from APC won Ekiti South West II constituency
 Akingbolu Tajudeen from APC won Ekiti West I  constituency
 Olubunmi Rachael Adelugba from APC won Emure constituency
 Teju Okuyiga from APC won Aiyekire constituency
 Fawekun Abiodun Babatunde from APC won Ido/Osi I constituency
 Akinnoso Emman from APC won Ido/OsI II constituency
 Ojo Martins Ademola from APC won Ijero state constituency
 Funminiyi Afuye from APC won Ikere I constituency
 Babatunde Lawrence Idowu from APC won Ikere II constituency
 Olugboyega Aribisogan Mathew from APC won Ikole I constituency
 Adeoye Stephen Aribasoye from APC won Ikole II constituency
 Ogunleye Olutope from APC won Ilejemeje constituency
 Akindele Femi Olanrewaju from APC won Irepodun/Ifelodun I constituency
 Ayodeji Hakeem Jamiu from APC won Irepodun/Ifelodun II constituency
 Ajayi Ayodeji Moses from APC won Ise/Orun constituency
 Adeyemi Raphael Ajibade from APC won Moba I constituency
 Arubu Michael Kola from APC won Moba II constituency
 Awoyemi Oluwaseun from APC won Oye I constituency
 Reuben and Ogunyemi Olatunji Abraham from APC won Oye II constituency
 Juwa Adegbuyi from APC won Ekiti East I constituency
 Lateef Akanle from APC won Ekiti East II constituency
 Johnson Oyebola Bode-Adeoye from APC won Ekiti West II constituency

References 

Ekiti
2019 Ekiti State elections